UTY may refer to:

UHF Television Yamanashi, Japanese broadcast network affiliated with the JNN
UTY (gene), histone demethylase UTY, enzyme that in humans is encoded by the UTY gene